Vista Glacier is located on north slopes of Glacier Peak in the U.S. state of Washington. As is true with all the glaciers found on Glacier Peak, Vista Glacier is retreating. From the end of the Little Ice Age to the mid-1950s, Vista Glacier experienced a general retreat upslope, followed by an advance during a cooler and wetter period until the mid-1970s. From then to 1997, the glacier returned to its previous minimal length recorded in 1946 and the process of retreat is ongoing.

See also
List of glaciers in the United States

References

Glaciers of Glacier Peak
Glaciers of Washington (state)